Koniuchy may refer to:
 Kaniūkai, village in Lithuania, former Koniuchy in Poland, site of the Koniuchy massacre in 1944
 Koniuchy, Lublin Voivodeship (east Poland)
 Koniuchy, a district of Toruń, Poland